Iván Morales may refer to:
 Iván Morales (boxer)
 Iván Morales (footballer)
 Ivan Morales Jr., Brazilian film editor and film maker